Allan H. MacDonald is a theoretical condensed matter physicist and the Sid W. Richardson Foundation Regents Chair Professor of Physics at The University of Texas at Austin. He was born in Antigonish, Nova Scotia, Canada, and attended local schools completing a B.S. at St. Francis Xavier University in 1973. He completed his Ph.D.in physics at The University of Toronto in 1978, working with S.H. Vosko on relativistic generalizations of density functional theory, and on the application of density functional theory to magnetism in metals.

Prior to joining the University of Texas, he worked at the Ottawa laboratory of the National Research Council of Canada (1978-1987) and at Indiana University (1987-2000). He has held visiting positions at the Swiss Federal Institute of Technology in Zurich and the Max Plank Institute for Solid State Research in Stuttgart.

MacDonald's research has focused on new or unexplained phenomena related to the quantum physics of interacting electrons in materials. He has contributed to theories of the integer and fractional Quantum Hall effects, spintronics in metals and semiconductors, topological Bloch bands and momentum-space Berry curvature phenomena, correlated electron-hole fluids and exciton and polariton condensates, and two-dimensional materials.

In 2011 MacDonald and Rafi Bistritzer, a former postdoctoral researcher in MacDonald's lab, predicted that it would be possible to realize strong correlation physics in graphene bilayers twisted to a magic relative orientation angle, foreshadowing the field of twistronics. Pablo Jarillo-Herrero, an experimentalist at MIT, found that the magic angle resulted in the unusual electrical properties the UT Austin scientists had predicted. At 1.1 degrees rotation at sufficiently low temperatures, electrons move from one layer to the other, creating a lattice and the phenomenon of superconductivity. The magic angle allows electrical current to pass unimpeded, apparently without energy loss. This could lead to more efficient electrical power transmission or new materials for quantum applications.

His recent work is focused on anticipating new physics in moire superlattices, and on achieving a full understanding of magic-angle bilayer graphene and transition-metal dichalcogenide moire superlattice systems.

MacDonald received the Canadian Association of Physicists's Herzberg Medal in 1987, the Oliver E. Buckley Prize of the American Physical Society in 2007, the Ernst Mach Honorary Medal of the Czech Academy of Sciences in 2012, and the Wolf Prize in Physics in 2020.  He was elected to the American Academy of Arts and Sciences in 2005 and the National Academy of the Sciences in 2012.

References

1951 births
Living people
People from Antigonish, Nova Scotia
Canadian condensed matter physicists
21st-century American physicists
St. Francis Xavier University alumni
University of Toronto alumni
University of Texas at Austin faculty
Fellows of the American Physical Society
Members of the United States National Academy of Sciences
Wolf Prize in Physics laureates
Oliver E. Buckley Condensed Matter Prize winners